Thazhuvatha Kaigal is a 1986 Indian Tamil-language romantic drama film, directed by R. Sundarrajan and produced by G. Sornambal, R. Ganapathy and Elango. The film stars Vijayakanth, Ambika, Senthil and Anuradha. It was released on 1 November 1986.

Plot

Cast 

Vijayakanth
Ambika
Senthil
Anuradha
Jai Ganesh in Guest appearance
Rajeev in Guest appearance
Kula Deivam V. R. Rajagopal
V. Gopalakrishnan
Pasi Narayanan
Oru Viral Krishna Rao
Usilai Mani
Mottai Seetharaman
Murugesh
Joker Thulasi
Charle
Omakuchi Narasimhan
Kutty Padmini
Indira
Sri Jaya

Soundtrack 
The music was composed by Ilaiyaraaja.

Release and reception 
Thazhuvatha Kaigal was released on 1 November 1986, and distributed by Metro Movies. Arbi of The Indian Express said Sundarrajan's direction "is thoughtful and even he does not make box office this time, he has no reason to be disillusioned". Jayamanmadhan of Kalki wrote if Vijayakanth and Ilaiyaraaja were left out, the film is a murky stream with no direction. At the 7th Cinema Express Awards, Ambika received a "special award" for her performance.

References

External links 
 

1980s Tamil-language films
1986 films
1986 romantic drama films
Films directed by R. Sundarrajan
Films scored by Ilaiyaraaja
Indian romantic drama films